Jacob Sachin (born 14 July 1995) is a Sri Lankan cricketer. He made his List A debut on 19 December 2019, for Galle Cricket Club in the 2019–20 Invitation Limited Over Tournament. He made his first-class debut on 31 January 2020, for Galle Cricket Club in Tier B of the 2019–20 Premier League Tournament. He made his Twenty20 debut on 7 March 2021, for Galle Cricket Club in the 2020–21 SLC Twenty20 Tournament.

References

External links
 

1995 births
Living people
Sri Lankan cricketers
Galle Cricket Club cricketers
Place of birth missing (living people)